Broadway is a 1929 film directed by Paul Fejos from the 1926 play of the same name by George Abbott and Philip Dunning. It stars Glenn Tryon, Evelyn Brent, Paul Porcasi, Robert Ellis, Merna Kennedy and Thomas E. Jackson.

This was Universal's first talking picture with Technicolor sequences. The film was released by the Criterion Collection on Blu-ray and DVD in 2012, with Paul Fejo's Lonesome.

Plot

Roy Lane and Billie Moore, entertainers at the Paradise Nightclub, are in love and are rehearsing an act together. Late to work one evening, Billie is saved from dismissal by Nick Verdis, the club proprietor, through the intervention of Steve Crandall, a bootlegger, who desires a liaison with the girl. "Scar" Edwards, robbed of a truckload of contraband liquor by Steve's gang, arrives at the club for a showdown with Steve and is shot in the back. Steve gives Billie a bracelet to forget that she has seen him helping a "drunk" from the club. Though Roy is arrested by Dan McCorn, he is later released on Billie's testimony. Nick is murdered by Steve. Billie witnesses the killing, but keeps quiet about the dirty business until she finds out Steve's next target is Roy. Billie is determined to tell her story to the police before Roy winds up dead, but Steve is not about to let that happen and kidnaps her.  Steve, in his car, is fired at from a taxi, and overheard by Pearl, he confesses to killing Edwards. Pearl confronts Steve in Nick's office and kills him; and McCorn, finding Steve's body, insists that he committed suicide, exonerating Pearl and leaving Roy and Billie to the success of their act.

Cast

Production
Director Fejos designed the camera crane specifically for use on this film, allowing unusually fluid movement and access to nearly every conceivable angle. It enlivened the visual style of this film and others that followed.

Preservation status
Both the silent version and the talking version of Broadway are extant, but the surviving talking version is incomplete. The color sequence at the end survives in color and in sound but the sound survives separately from the picture. The surviving color footage is from the silent version and has been synchronized to the surviving disc audio.

Home media
In 2012, the sound version of Broadway was reconstructed by The Criterion Collection and included as an extra feature on the DVD and Blu-ray release of Paul Fejos' 1928 film, Lonesome.

See also
List of early color feature films

References

External links

1929 musical films
1920s color films
1929 films
American black-and-white films
Films about theatre
American films based on plays
Films directed by Paul Fejos
Films set in New York City
Transitional sound films
Universal Pictures films
American musical films
1920s English-language films
1920s American films